The JSC A.S. Yakovlev Design Bureau is a Russian aircraft designer and manufacturer (design office prefix Yak). Its head office is in Aeroport District, Northern Administrative Okrug, Moscow.

Overview
The bureau formed in 1934 under designer Alexander Sergeyevich Yakovlev as OKB-115 (the design bureau has its own production base at the facility No.115), but dates its birth from 12 May 1927, the day of maiden flight of the AIR-1 aircraft developed within the Department of Light Aircraft of GUAP (Head Agency of Aviation Industry) under the supervision of A.S. Yakovlev.

During World War II Yakovlev designed and produced a famed line of fighter aircraft.

Irkut acquired Yakovlev in April 2004. The Russian government merged the holding company with Mikoyan, Ilyushin, Irkut, Sukhoi and Tupolev as a new company named United Aircraft Building Corporation in February 2006.

The firm designed the Pchela ("bee") drone reconnaissance aircraft (first flown in 1990), but is perhaps best known for its highly successful line of World War II-era piston-engined fighter-aircraft.

See also

 List of military aircraft of the Soviet Union and the CIS
 List of Yakovlev aircraft
 SOKOL Aircraft Building Plant

References

 A book by A.T.Stepanets. Yak Fighters in WWII  (in Russian)
 Степанец А.Т.- Истребители "Як" периода Великой Отечественной войны. Справочник. - М.: Машиностроение, 1992. - 224 с.: ил:

External links

 http://www.yak.ru click on ENG for English.
 Yakovlev Aircraft of U.S.

 
United Aircraft Corporation
Companies based in Moscow
Helicopter manufacturers of Russia
Aircraft manufacturers of Russia
Helicopter manufacturers of the Soviet Union
Unmanned aerial vehicle manufacturers
Design bureaus